Parit Malintang is a town or Sub-district in Padang Pariaman Regency, of West Sumatra province of Indonesia and it is the seat (capital) of Padang Pariaman Regency.

Padang Pariaman Regency
Populated places in West Sumatra
Regency seats of West Sumatra